The Minnesota North District is one of the 35 districts of the Lutheran Church–Missouri Synod (LCMS), and covers the northern two-thirds of the state of Minnesota; it also includes two congregations in Wisconsin. The southern third of Minnesota constitutes the Minnesota South District, and the rest of Wisconsin is divided between the North Wisconsin and South Wisconsin Districts. In addition, two Minnesota congregations are in the non-geographic English District. The Minnesota North District includes 198 congregations, subdivided into 18 circuits, as well as 19 Lutheran preschools, and 8 elementary schools. Baptized membership in district congregations is approximately 46,944.

The Minnesota North District was formed in 1963 when the Minnesota District was divided. District offices are located in Brainerd, Minnesota. Delegates from each congregation meet in convention every three years to elect the district president, vice presidents, circuit counselors, a board of directors, and other officers. The Rev. Brady Finnern has been the district president since 2022.

Presidents
Rev. Alfred C. Seltz, 1963–1970
Rev. August T. Mennicke, 1970–1986
Rev. Richard L. Guehna, 1986–1996 (died in office)
Rev. David P. Strohschein, 1996–1997 (acting president)
Rev. David A. Bode, 1997–2003
Rev. Donald J. Fondow, 2003–2022
Rev. Brady L. Finnern, 2022–present

References

External links

LCMS: Minnesota North District
LCMS Congregation Directory
Synodal-Bericht des Minnesota und Dakota Distrikts der Deutschen Evang.-Luth. Synode von Missouri, Ohio und Andern Staaten (1882–1889)
Synodal-Bericht des Minnesota und Dakota Distrikts der Deutschen Evang.-Luth. Synode von Missouri, Ohio und Andern Staaten (1891–1910)

Lutheran Church–Missouri Synod districts
Lutheranism in Minnesota
Lutheranism in Wisconsin
Christian organizations established in 1963